T117 or variation, may refer to:

Vehicles
 Bartini T-117, a Soviet World War II cargo aircraft
 FMC T117, a steel-based prototype version of the M113 armored personnel carrier
 Talus MB-H amphibious tractor T 117
  (T117), a British Royal Navy World War II Dance-class trawler
 , a World War II Lend-Lease ship; formerly the Admirable-class minesweeper USS Arch (AM-144)

Places
 Terengganu State Route T117, Malaysia; a highway
 Põhimaantee 117 (T117), Estonian national route 117; see Estonian national road 1

Other uses
 KHD T117, an aero-engine; see List of aircraft engines
 UNISOC T117, a computer chip; see List of UNISOC processors
 T117, a bus route in Kuala Lumpur, Malaysia; see List of bus routes in Greater Kuala Lumpur

See also

 Type 117 inshore minesweeper of the Yugoslav Navy; see List of ships of the Yugoslav Navy
 Peugeot Type 117, an automobile; see List of Peugeot vehicles
 Blériot Aéronautique Type 117 escort fighter, a French Interwar airplane
 
 
 117 (disambiguation)
 T17 (disambiguation)